These are the official results of the 2005 South American Championships in Athletics which took place from July 21–24, 2005 in Cali, Colombia.

Men's results

100 meters

Heats – July 21Wind:Heat 1: -1.7 m/s, Heat 2: -0.4 m/s

Final – July 21Wind:+0.2 m/s

200 meters

Heats – July 23Wind:Heat 1: 0.0 m/s, Heat 2: 0.0 m/s

Final – July 23Wind:+4.9 m/s

400 meters

Heats – July 22

Final – July 22

800 meters
July 24

1500 meters
July 22

5000 meters
July 24

10,000 meters
July 22

110 meters hurdles
July 22Wind: +3.4 m/s

400 meters hurdles
July 23

3000 meters steeplechase
July 23

4 x 100 meters relay
July 23

4 x 400 meters relay
July 24

20 kilometers walk
July 22

High jump
July 24

Pole vault
July 22

Long jump
July 23

Triple jump
July 22

Shot put
July 22

Discus throw
July 24

Hammer throw
July 24

Javelin throw
July 24

Decathlon

Women's results

100 meters
July 22Wind: +0.5 m/s

200 meters
July 23Wind: +5.0 m/s

400 meters

Heats – July 22

Final – July 22

800 meters
July 24

1500 meters
July 22

5000 meters
July 24

10,000 meters
July 22

100 meters hurdles
July 22Wind: +0.1 m/s

400 meters hurdles
July 23

3000 meters steeplechase
July 23

4 x 100 meters relay
July 23

4 x 400 meters relay
July 23

20 kilometers walk
July 23

High jump
July 22

Pole vault
July 23

Long jump
July 23

Triple jump
July 24

Shot put
July 23

Discus throw
July 24

Hammer throw
July 24

Javelin throw
July 23

Heptathlon

References

South American Championships
Events at the South American Championships in Athletics